

Crown
 Head of State – Queen Elizabeth II

Federal government
 Governor General – Ray Hnatyshyn

Cabinet
 Prime Minister –  Jean Chrétien
 Deputy Prime Minister – Sheila Copps
 Minister of Finance – Paul Martin
 Secretary of State for External Affairs – André Ouellet
 Minister of National Defence – David Collenette
 Minister of National Health and Welfare – Diane Marleau
 Minister of Industry, Science and Technology – John Manley
 Minister of Intergovernmental Affairs – Marcel Massé
 Minister of the Environment – Sheila Copps
 Minister of Justice – Allan Rock
 Minister of Transport – Doug Young
 Minister of Communications – Michel Dupuy
 Minister of Citizenship and Immigration – Sergio Marchi (position created June 30, 1994)
 Minister of Fisheries and Oceans – Brian Tobin
 Minister of Agriculture – Ralph Goodale
 Minister of Public Works – David Dingwall
 Minister of Employment and Immigration – Lloyd Axworthy
 Minister of Energy, Mines and Resources – Anne McLellan
 Minister of Forestry – Anne McLellan

Members of Parliament
See: 35th Canadian parliament

Party leaders
 Liberal Party of Canada –  Jean Chrétien
 Bloc Québécois – Lucien Bouchard
 New Democratic Party- Audrey McLaughlin
 Progressive Conservative Party of Canada – Jean Charest
 Reform Party of Canada – Preston Manning

Supreme Court Justices
 Chief Justice: Antonio Lamer
 Beverley McLachlin
 Frank Iacobucci
 John C. Major
 Gérard V. La Forest
 John Sopinka
 Peter deCarteret Cory
 Claire L'Heureux-Dubé
 Charles D. Gonthier

Other
 Speaker of the House of Commons – John Allen Fraser then Gilbert Parent
 Governor of the Bank of Canada – John Crow then Gordon Thiessen
 Chief of the Defence Staff – General John de Chastelain General Jean Boyle

Provinces

Premiers
 Premier of Alberta – Ralph Klein
 Premier of British Columbia – Mike Harcourt
 Premier of Manitoba – Gary Filmon
 Premier of New Brunswick – Frank McKenna
 Premier of Newfoundland – Clyde Wells
 Premier of Nova Scotia – John Savage
 Premier of Ontario – Bob Rae
 Premier of Prince Edward Island – Catherine Callbeck
 Premier of Quebec – Robert Bourassa then Daniel Johnson, Jr. then Jacques Parizeau
 Premier of Saskatchewan – Roy Romanow
 Premier of the Northwest Territories – Nellie Cournoyea
 Premier of Yukon – John Ostashek

Lieutenant-governors
 Lieutenant-Governor of Alberta – Gordon Towers
 Lieutenant-Governor of British Columbia – David Lam
 Lieutenant-Governor of Manitoba – Yvon Dumont
 Lieutenant-Governor of New Brunswick – Gilbert Finn then Margaret Norrie McCain
 Lieutenant-Governor of Newfoundland and Labrador – Frederick Russell
 Lieutenant-Governor of Nova Scotia – Lloyd Roseville Crouse then James Kinley
 Lieutenant-Governor of Ontario – Hal Jackman
 Lieutenant-Governor of Prince Edward Island – Marion Reid
 Lieutenant-Governor of Quebec – Martial Asselin
 Lieutenant-Governor of Saskatchewan – Sylvia Fedoruk then Jack Wiebe

Mayors
 Toronto – Barbara Hall
 Montreal – Jean Doré then Pierre Bourque
 Vancouver – Philip Owen
 Ottawa – Jacquelin Holzman

Religious leaders
 Roman Catholic Bishop of Quebec –  Archbishop Maurice Couture
 Roman Catholic Bishop of Montreal –  Cardinal Archbishop Jean-Claude Turcotte
 Roman Catholic Bishops of London – Bishop John Michael Sherlock
 Moderator of the United Church of Canada – Stan McKay then Marion Best

See also
 1993 Canadian incumbents
 Events in Canada in 1994
 1995 Canadian incumbents
 Governmental leaders in 1994
 Canadian incumbents by year

1994
Incumbents
1994 in Canadian politics
Canadian leaders